Krysten Karwacki (born April 30, 1991) is a Canadian curler from Winnipeg, Manitoba. She is the former lead for the Cathy Overton-Clapham team and currently plays lead on Team Nancy Martin.

Career
Semifinalist at the 2011 Canadian Junior Curling Championships
Finalist of the 2012 Atkins Curling Supplies Women's Classic
Women's Semifinalist of the 2012 CIS/CCA Curling Championships
Women's Champion of the 2013 CIS/CCA Curling Championships
Played lead in the 2013-14 curling season for Breanne Meakin
2017 Scotties Silver Medallist as alternate for Michelle Englot
2021 Scotties Gold Medallist as alternate for Kerri Einarson

Personal life
Karwacki works as a social media freelancer. She is engaged to Roman Charbonneau.

References

External links

1991 births
Living people
Canadian women curlers
Curlers from Winnipeg
20th-century Canadian women
21st-century Canadian women